17α-Estradiol (also known as 17α-E2, 17-epiestradiol, alfatradiol, or estra-1,3,5(10)-triene-3,17α-diol) is a minor and weak endogenous steroidal estrogen that is related to 17β-estradiol (better known simply as estradiol). It is the C17 epimer of estradiol. It has approximately 100-fold lower estrogenic potency than 17β-estradiol. The compound shows preferential affinity for the ERα over the ERβ. Although 17α-estradiol is far weaker than 17β-estradiol as an agonist of the nuclear estrogen receptors, it has been found to bind to and activate the brain-expressed ER-X with a greater potency than that of 17β-estradiol, suggesting that it may be the predominant endogenous ligand for the receptor.

Aging 
Supplementation with 17α-Estradiol increases the median lifespan of male mice by 19%, while not affecting female lifespan. This treatment does not lead to feminization of male mice.  17α-Estradiol furthermore alleviates age-related metabolic and inflammatory dysfunction and improves glucose tolerance in male mice. The exact reason for this sex-specific increase in lifespan is unknown, however, the effect on male lifespan is gone in castrated mice, suggesting that the metabolic response to 17α-Estradiol requires the presence of male gonadal hormones. Whether these results are translatable to humans is currently unknown.

See also
 List of estrogens

References

Secondary alcohols
Estranes
Estrogens
Hormones of the hypothalamus-pituitary-gonad axis
Sex hormones